Bradnop railway station was a railway station that served the village of Bradnop, Staffordshire. It was opened by the North Staffordshire Railway (NSR) in 1905 and closed to passenger use in 1935, but remained open to freight traffic until 1964.

Construction and opening
The single-line branch was authorised on 1 March 1899 by the Leek, Caldon Low, and Hartington Light Railways Order, 1898, and construction took several years.

The station at Bradnop was built in a cutting on the long gradient from Leek Brook to Ipstones.

Station layout

The station had a single platform and limited goods facilities. Although the station buildings and passenger platform were in a cutting, the small goods yard was constructed at the top of the bank and this necessitated quite a steep gradient in the track leading from the branch line to the goods yard.

In NSR days the station staff comprised a Station Master, 1 porter and 1 porter/signalman.

The station buildings were of wooden construction and had to be rebuilt following a fire in April 1926 which destroyed the original building.

Closure
The branch line was never a financial success and passenger services were withdrawn on 30 September 1935. The station remained open as a goods station until May 1964 when all traffic on the branch except mineral workings from Caldon Low quarries was withdrawn.

The site today 
Mineral trains to Caldon Low continued until 1989 when the line was mothballed.  In 2009 Moorland and City Railways purchased the line with the intention of reopening the line to mineral traffic from the quarry. In 2014 this plan was placed on hold as the Competition Commission ruled that Lafarge Tarmac must sell one of its sites, possibly Caldon Low, so the heritage railway, the Churnet Valley Railway, are seeking to purchase the line themselves.

Route

Notes

References
 
 
 
 
 

Disused railway stations in Staffordshire
Railway stations in Great Britain opened in 1905
Railway stations in Great Britain closed in 1935
Former North Staffordshire Railway stations
Staffordshire Moorlands